John Martin (December 11, 1827 – February 28, 1893), was an early pioneer of Monterey County, California. In 1859, he purchased  near the mouth of Carmel Valley near today's Carmel Mission, before the development of Carmel-by-the-Sea. The Martin homestead is now called Mission Ranch. It was bought in 1986 by Clint Eastwood, who restored the  farmhouse, cottage, and barn in the style of the original buildings.

Early life 

John Martin was born on December 11, 1827, in Strathaven, Lanarkshire, Scotland. His parents were pioneers William Martin (1799-1885) and Agnes Martin (1797-1878). William and Agnes Martin emigrated from Scotland with their five sons, John (1827-1893), Robert (1828-1905), William (1832-1913), James (1835-1913), Thomas (1840-1911), and a daughter Mary (1837-1916). They first came to Ontario, Canada in the 1840s. During the California Gold Rush, they sailed by steam boat from Canada to Panama, traveling through the Isthmus of Panama by boat up the coast. When they landed in Monterey by ship in 1856, they acquired a ranch at Neponset, California, an area north of Monterey, where the family became farmers.

Professional life

John Martin bought  from land broker Lafayette F. and Annie Loveland in 1859. The land was bounded by 12th and Santa Lucia avenues, which today is known as Carmel Point, Hatton Fields, and the Carmel River. The property became known as Mission Ranch because it was so close to the Carmel Mission. 

The Martin Ranch was a cattle ranch and dryland farming operation. They farmed potatoes, barley, and had a milk dairy. The property became one of the first California dairies that supplied the county with cheese and butter. The barns were used for hay and milking.

Martin married Elizabeth Hislop Stewart (1840-1916) on February 10, 1871, in Middlesex, Ontario, Canada, while he was visiting Canada. She was a widow with three sons. Martin and Elizabeth had six children together in 12 years, raising them at the Martin ranch and dairy. James A. (1871-1936), William E. (1873-1959), and Royden Martin Sr. (1882-1961) of Carmel Valley, Robert Henry Martin (1875-1934) of Neponset, Carmel Martin (1879-1965) of Monterey, and Isabel Martin (1884-1961) of Carmel, were all born on the Martin Ranch.

John Martin built a one story hipped-roof farmhouse in the early 1870s for his wife and children. The ranch included barns, bunkhouse, and several outhouses. A second story was added by 1896. The farmhouse is still present today and is part of the Mission Ranch resort.   

All of Martin's sons made farming their career except for Carmel Martin (1879-1965), the youngest of the Martin boys. He graduated from University of Michigan in 1907 with a law degree. He returned to Monterey in 1908 and became a partner in the Treat, Hudson & Martin law firm. He was elected mayor of Monterey from 1911 to 1913 and a Monterey County Planning Commission member for 24 years. He also setup the Martin Estate Co., owned by the Martin children. The Martins sold land between Twelfth Avenue and Santa Lucia Avenue to the Carmel Development Company, owned by Frank Hubbard Powers and James Franklin Devendorf in 1903. This land became Carmel Point and was subdivided into lots.

The Martin Ranch was sold on August 23, 1929, to millionaire tycoon Willis J. and Alma Walker of Pebble Beach for $150,000. Walker was chairman of the Red River Lumber Company. His father, Thomas B. Walker, was a business magnate who acquired lumber in Minnesota and California and became an art collector. Several abandoned mine shafts were found on the ranch.

William E. Martin was the son of John and Elizabeth Martin. In 1903, he married Anna Mary Hatton (1876-1939), the daughter of William Hatton (1849–1894) and Kate Harney (1851-1922), which united two pioneering Carmel Valley families. In 1907, William purchased land in Carmel Valley and operated a dairy business, which was located at Highway 1 and Carmel Valley Road, at the site of the present-day the Barnyard Shopping Village. This area is now called Hatton Fields.

Robert George Leidig (1879-1970) fell in love with Isabelle A. Martin, the daughter of John Martin. They married on October 20, 1910, at the Martin Ranch. Robert and Isabel invested in Carmel's commercial real estate, including the Isabel Leidig Building, a historic commercial building on Dolores Street between Ocean Avenue and 7th Avenue.

Death

Martin died by suicide on Tuesday, February 28, 1893, in what is today known as Carmel-by-the-Sea, California, at the age of 65. He had been sick for several weeks, and hung himself from a tree on his ranch according to the coroner. His funeral took place on Thursday morning with many of his close friends attending. His remains were buried at the Martin Plot, at the Monterey City Cemetery in Monterey, California.

His wife, Elizabeth stayed on the ranch for the rest of her life. She died on November 25, 1916, in Carmel, having lived a long life of 76 years. Her funeral took place at the family ranch. Her remains were buried at the Martin Plot, at the Monterey City Cemetery.

Legacy

Today, the  ranch is the Mission Ranch hotel and restaurant, now owned by Clint Eastwood since 1986. He restored the property in the style of the original buildings. Buildings on the property reflect the architectural period of the 1850s, that includes the restaurant and dance barn and the century old Martin farmhouse and bunkhouse.

See also
 Timeline of Carmel-by-the-Sea, California

References

External links

 Mission Ranch Hotel and Restaurant

1827 births
1893 deaths
Scottish people
People from Carmel-by-the-Sea, California